Stephen Dwain "Steve" Wood (born 1963 in Cleveland, Ohio) is an American bishop. He is currently serving as the first bishop of the Diocese of the Carolinas, a diocese of the Anglican Church in North America (ACNA), as well as rector of St. Andrew's Anglican Church in Mount Pleasant, South Carolina.

Early life and career
Wood was born in Cleveland, Ohio and grew up in Wickliffe, Ohio. He received his B.A. from Cleveland State University in 1986 and his M.Div. from Virginia Theological Seminary in 1991, after which he was ordained to the priesthood of the Episcopal Church. Wood served at Episcopal churches in Ohio until being called in 2000 as rector of St. Andrew's, Mount Pleasant, which was then a parish of the Episcopal Diocese of South Carolina.

Under Wood's leadership, St. Andrews was described as "one of the Lowcountry’s biggest church success stories", growing to a membership of more than 3,000 and planting new churches in Goose Creek, downtown Charleston, and the Park Circle area of North Charleston. In 2006, Wood was one of three finalists in the election for Bishop of South Carolina; ultimately Mark Lawrence was elected. In 2010, St. Andrew's voted by a large margin to leave the Episcopal Church and affiliate with the Anglican Church in North America.

Episcopacy
Shortly after joining ACNA, Wood became involved with efforts to create the Diocese of the Carolinas, which was formed with 14 congregations with an average Sunday attendance of over 2,700. He served as vicar general of the diocese while in formation and, in 2012, he was elected to serve as its first bishop. Wood was consecrated on August 25, 2012, at St. Andrew's by Archbishop Robert Duncan. Co-consecrators included Archbishop-elect Stanley Ntagali of Uganda and Bishops Roger Ames, John Guernsey, and Alphonza Gadsden.

Notes

External links
Diocese of the Carolinas
Treading Grain blog

Living people
Bishops of the Anglican Church in North America
Religious leaders from Cleveland
1963 births
People from Wickliffe, Ohio
Anglican realignment people